The first USS Shark was a schooner in the United States Navy. Built in the Washington Navy Yard to the designs of Henry Steers, Shark was launched on 17 May 1821. On 11 May 1821, Matthew C. Perry was ordered to take command of Shark, and the ship was ready to receive her crew on 2 June 1821.

History
Shark sailed from the Washington Navy Yard on 15 July for New York, where she received Dr. Eli Ayers on board for transportation to the west coast of Africa. She cleared New York harbor on 7 August to make her first cruise for the suppression of the slave trade and piracy. Sailing by way of the Madeira, Canary, and Cape Verde islands, she landed Dr. Ayers at Sierra Leone in west Africa in October and returned by way of the West Indies to New York on 17 January 1822.

Shark put to sea from New York on 26 February and joined Commodore James Biddle's squadron for the suppression of piracy and slave trading in the West Indies. On 25 March, Lt. Perry took formal possession of what is now Key West, Florida, in the name of the United States. He called the island Thompson's Island to honor Secretary of the Navy Smith Thompson and named the harbor Port Rodgers to compliment Commodore John Rodgers. Under orders from Commodore Biddle, Shark departed Nassau on 14 August for another cruise to the coast of Africa and returned to Norfolk, Virginia on 12 December 1822. She again sailed for the West Indies in February 1823, and returned to New York on 9 July for repairs. On 5 October, she sailed from New York carrying Commodore John Rodgers and three Navy surgeons to Thompson's Island to determine the fitness of that place as a naval base. She debarked Rodgers and his party at Norfolk on 16 November 1823 before resuming her cruise in the West Indies. She returned to New York on 13 May 1824.

After repairs in the New York Navy Yard, Shark sailed from New York on 5 October 1825 and cruised in the West Indies and the Gulf of Mexico until 29 August 1826, when she arrived at Norfolk. On 28 November she departed Norfolk and proceeded to the coast of Africa to protect slaves freed from captured slave ships. After seeing that the liberated slaves were safely established in Liberia, she returned by way of the Caribbean and arrived at New York on 5 July 1827.

The busy schooner sailed again on 24 July for a cruise to the Newfoundland fisheries to defend American interests there and returned on 6 October. She then resumed her duty in the West Indies, which included anti-slavery and anti-piracy patrols and periodic voyages to West Africa to check the American settlements there.

In 1833, Shark was relieved in the West Indies by the schooner Experiment, and sailed for the Mediterranean, where she remained for the next five years, cruising extensively in order to protect American commerce. She cleared Gibraltar for the United States on 22 January 1838 and. sailing by way of the West Indies, arrived at the Norfolk Navy Yard on 24 March.

Shark put to sea from Hampton Roads on 22 July 1839 for duty with the Pacific Squadron. She was the first United States man-of-war to pass through the Straits of Magellan from east to west, a feat accomplished on 13 December 1839 en route to Callao, Peru. During the next five years, she spent much of her time along the coast of Peru to protect American citizens and property during civil disturbances in that country. The Secretary of the Navy noted in 1841 that “all who witnessed the operations of the Shark were inspired with increased respect for the American flag.” She also made infrequent cruises northward to observe conditions in Panama and to receive mail.

Sinking
On 1 April 1846, Shark was ordered to Honolulu, Hawaii for repairs in preparation for an exploratory voyage up the Columbia River, "to obtain correct information of that country and to cheer our citizens in that region by the presence of the American flag." She reached the coast of Oregon on 15 July 1846, and soon crossed the bar off the mouth of the Columbia River (after grounding once on 18 July without any "material damage"),  for explorations in the lower Columbia River and Willamette Valley while staging out of Fort Vancouver. After several weeks in the vicinity of the fort, the vessel returned to the mouth of the river on 8 September; and, knowing that the bar had changed position since the last survey was made, spent the following day making new observations of the bar and other preparations for crossing. However, her effort to recross the bar ended in disaster on 10 September, for she struck an uncharted shoal and was swept into the breakers by a swift tide. Shark was a total loss, but her entire crew was saved. Upon learning of the vessel's demise, the Royal Navy and Hudson's Bay Company's officers at Fort Vancouver immediately coordinated and dispatched a relief effort, including food, tobacco, and clothing. Lt. Howison soon returned to Fort Vancouver, where he acquired additional supplies and on 16 November chartered the Hudson's Bay Company schooner . She reached San Francisco, California on 27 January 1847. A court of inquiry absolved Lt. Neil M. Howison of all blame for the loss of his ship.

Artifacts
Several artifacts associated with the wrecked schooner are on public display in Oregon. The schooner's capstan and one carronade are on display at the Cannon Beach History Center in Cannon Beach, Oregon. The carronade was discovered four or five miles north of Arch Cape in 1898, and is what gave Cannon Beach its name. On 16 February 2008, two more carronades believed to have belonged to Shark were discovered on the beach near Arch Cape, Oregon. The newly discovered carronades were restored at the Center for Maritime Archaeology and Conservation at Texas A&M University and are now on display at the Columbia River Maritime Museum in Astoria, Oregon. The Maritime Museum exhibit also features an officer's sword that is believed to have originated on Shark, along with a large rock known as "Shark Rock" that features words and dates believed to be etched on by survivors of the wreck.

Notes

External links
 Sympathy & Prompt Attentions: Fort Vancouver's Relief of the US Schooner Shark, 1846 provides a detailed account of the U.S. Schooner Sharks sojourn in the Oregon Country in 1846.
 Fort Vancouver National Historic Site Public programs, publications and annual living history events recount the experience of the Shark and its crew.
 Graphic of the U.S.S. Shark
 USS Shark opens portal to the past

 

Schooners of the United States Navy
Shipwrecks of the Oregon coast
Ships built in the District of Columbia
1821 ships
Maritime incidents in September 1846